Jhoanna Marie Ramilo Tan (born October 9, 1993) is a Filipino actress and politician. She is known for portraying the role of young Eunice in GMA Network's remake of the 2003 Korean drama Stairway to Heaven. Recently in 2018, after a short hiatus due to her pregnancy, she joined the cast of GMA's newest drama-thriller series The Cure, where she plays the role of April, a nurse who gets infected by a presumed-safe, rapidly-mutating anti-cancer drug from a bite.

Personal life 
Jhoana Marie Tan was born and raised in Caloocan. In 2017, she gave birth to her first daughter. She is currently signed under contract in GMA Network, though in 2009 she was given supporting roles in ABS-CBN before finally staying with GMA. In 2010, she ran for the position of SK Chairman of Baesa-160, Caloocan in the 2010 Philippine barangay and Sangguniang Kabataan elections.

2003-2016 
Tan started her career as young Janeth on the film Mano Po in home in 2003. She appeared in a few supporting roles in ABS-CBN before signing a contract with GMA Network. Since then, she has been given many projects, including her breakout television drama, Stairway to Heaven, along with Nita Negrita, Alakdana, Strawberry Lane, Wish I May, The Millionaire's Wife (TV series) and Magkaibang Mundo, among other programming.  She was given the title of "primera kontrabida" for her role in Anna Karenina in 2013 as Carla Monteclaro. She was also cast in 2014's Strawberry Lane as Guadalupe Delapdo-Bustamante. She was then given roles in the latter three aforementioned series before going on-leave for her pregnancy. She was best known for antagonist roles in drama.

2018-present 
In 2018, she is cast in the latest primetime drama-thriller series, The Cure where she is portraying the role of a nurse who gets infected with a contagious and highly unstable, anti-cancer drug from a recent bite that gives its victims "zombie-like" characteristics, eventually starting an epidemic across the country in the process, as well as My Special Tatay as Britney, In 2019, she is cast in the afternoon drama Magkaagaw as Shiela Herrera. She was then given a role in Ang Dalawang Ikaw as Lani Delgado.

Filmography

Movies

Television

References

External links

1993 births
Living people
Filipino child actresses
Filipino television actresses
GMA Network personalities
People from Caloocan
Actresses from Metro Manila
Politicians from Metro Manila